Numb is a Canadian electro-industrial band that is based in Vancouver, British Columbia, Canada.

History
Numb was founded by Don Gordon, David Hall and Sean Stubbs in 1986. The band issued their self-titled debut studio album Numb in 1987 on Edge and World Records. Their second album Christmeister was released by Lively Art in 1989.

The band's third album Death on the Installment Plan, released in 1993, featured weird electronic tape-loops overlaid with heavily distorted vocals. The 1994 album Wasted Sky used some of the same techniques, but with a darker feel and more technically varied approach.

Singer David Collins joined the band in 1995; the band released its fifth album, Blood Meridian, which contained strong, violent electronic sound but no guitar music, in 1997. Two years later, Numb recorded the electronic dance album Language of Silence, released through Metropolis.  The tracks on this album were somewhat quieter and darkly intense.

Following the release of one final single, "Suspended", Numb disbanded in 1998, and Gordon moved to Vietnam to live with his wife.

After what was considered by many to be a retirement of the project and Don Gordon from the music scene in general, an album of new material was made available via Bandcamp on August 23, 2019 titled Mortal Geometry.

Members
 Don Gordon – Producing
 David Collings – Vocals (1995–2000)
 Conan Hunter – Vocals, Programming (1992–1994)
 Blair Dobson – Vocals (1989–1991)
 David Hall – Keyboards, Programming (1986–1991)
 Sean Stubbs (Sean St.Hubbs) – Vocals, Drums, Percussion (1986–1988), Live Drums (1994–1995, 1998)

Discography

Full length albums and EPs
Studio albums
 Numb (1987, Edge/World)
 Christmeister (1989, Lively Art)
 Death on the Installment Plan (1993, KK)
 Wasted Sky (1994, KK)
 Koro (1996, Gift)
 Blood Meridian (1997, Metropolis)
 Language of Silence (1998, Metropolis)
 Mortal Geometry (2019, Metropolis)

Compilation albums
 The Valence Of Noise (2014, Minimal Maximal)

Singles & EPs
 Blue Light (1987, Burning)
 Serie Limitée (1988, Out Of Nowhere)
 Bliss (1991, Oceana/Onslot Music)
 Fixate (1993, KK)
 Blind (1997, Metropolis)
 Desire/Blind Remixes (1998, KK)
 Suspended (1998, Metropolis)

Compilation appearances
 "Eugene (Pickaxe Mix by Pig and Andrew Burton)" on Funky Alternatives Vol. 6 Concrete (1991)
 "Curse (Metastsizing Dub)" on Electro-Genetic  KK (1993)
 "Shithammer (Dread & Bled)" on Moonraker Off Beat (1993)
 "Blue Light, Black Candle (live)" on Celtic Circle Sampler #2 Celtic Circle Productions (1994)
 "Ratblast (Compressed & Distressed)" on The Digital Space Between Hard (1994)
 "Decay of the Angel" on Body Rapture Vol. 4  Zoth Ommog (1994)
  cover of Salt-n-Pepa's "Push It" on Operation Beatbox  Re-constriction (1996)
 "Mr. Rogers' Neighborhood" on TV Terror: Felching a Dead Horse  Re-constriction (1997)
 "Blind (Hyper-dilated) on Electronic Lust, Vol. 1  Orkus (1998)
 "Desire (Protean)" on The O-Files Vol. 3  Off Beat (1998)
 "Desire (Prelude and Nocturne)" on The O-Files Vol. 3  Off Beat (1998)
 "Blind (Mentallo Mix)" on The O-Files Vol. 3  Off Beat (1998)
 "Blood (Crash & Bleed Edit)" on Electropolis, Vol. 1  Metropolis (1998)
 cover of the theme from "Suspiria" on Electronic Lust  Orkus (1999)
 "Half-Life" on Septic Vol. 1  Dependent (1999)
 "Respect" on Electro Club Attack-Shot 2  XXC (1999)
 "Static" on Electropolis, Vol. 2  Metropolis (2000)
 "Deviation" on Orgazma Tracks Vol. 3  Alter Ego (2001)

Side projects
 Halo-Gen (Pendragon Records)

References

External links

Numb at Bandcamp

Musical groups established in 1986
Musical groups disestablished in 2000
Musical groups reestablished in 2019
Musical groups from Vancouver
1986 establishments in British Columbia
Canadian industrial music groups
Electro-industrial music groups
Metropolis Records artists
Re-Constriction Records artists
Zoth Ommog Records artists